The Tonga ground skink (Tachygyia microlepis) is an extinct species of skink endemic to the island of Tonga.

References

Sources
The Reptile Database

Skinks
Reptile extinctions since 1500
Extinct animals of Oceania
Reptiles described in 1839
Taxonomy articles created by Polbot
Taxa named by André Marie Constant Duméril
Taxa named by Gabriel Bibron